Niday Place State Forest is a Virginia state forest located on John's Creek Mountain in Craig County.   in size, it is a wildlife sanctuary and is used as an outdoor laboratory; it contains mainly mountain hardwoods.  It is managed by Appomattox-Buckingham and Cumberland State Forests. Land for the state forest was donated by Anne H. Cutler of Williamsburg, Virginia.

References

External links
Virginia state forests

Virginia state forests
Protected areas of Craig County, Virginia
1989 establishments in Virginia
Protected areas established in 1989